Heartstopper is an ongoing young adult LGBTQ+ graphic novel and webcomic series written and illustrated by British author Alice Oseman. It follows the lives of Nick Nelson and Charlie Spring as they meet and fall in love. The series is an expanded adaptation of Oseman's 2015 novella, Nick and Charlie, although the characters originally appeared in Oseman's 2014 novel Solitaire.

The series was later adapted into the Netflix television series of the same name written by Alice Oseman and starring Kit Connor as Nick and Joe Locke as Charlie. The first series premiered in 2022 to critical acclaim. A second and third series are currently in development.

Premise
Heartstopper tells the story of Charlie Spring and Nick Nelson – two British schoolboys who attend the fictional Truham Grammar School – as they meet and fall in love. The series also follows the lives of their friends and their relationships, many of whom are LGBTQ+.

Characters

Main
Charles "Charlie" Spring, a recently outed year 10 student who falls for Nick. He suffers from an eating disorder.
Nicholas "Nick" Nelson, popular year 11 student who is a member, and later captain, of the school's rugby team. He realises that he is bisexual after developing feelings for Charlie.

Friends
Tao Xu, one of Charlie's friends and later Elle's boyfriend.
Elle Argent, Charlie's friend and Tao's girlfriend. She is transgender.
Tara Jones, an old friend of Nick's who becomes his confidant when he starts to explore his sexuality. She is in a relationship with Darcy.
Darcy Olsson, Tara's girlfriend.
Aled Last, Charlie's friend and the main character in another of Oseman's novels, Radio Silence.
Sahar Zahid, the group's new friend who starts sixth form at the same time as Nick.

Other
Victoria "Tori" Spring, Charlie's older sister, and the main character in Oseman's Solitaire novel.
Benjamin "Ben" Hope, a closeted student with whom Charlie was in a toxic relationship with at the beginning of the series.
Harry Greene, a homophobic bully.
Sarah Nelson, Nick's mother. She is divorced from Nick's father, Stéphane, a Frenchman.
Oliver "Olly" Spring, Charlie's younger brother.
Jane Spring, Charlie's mother.
Julio Spring, Charlie's father.
David Nelson, Nick's older brother, who dismisses Nick's sexuality as "a phase". 
Nellie Nelson, Nick's first dog, a Border Collie.
Henry Nelson, Nick's second dog, a Pug.

Development and release
The characters of Nick Nelson and Charlie Spring first appeared in Oseman's novel Solitaire (2014) in supporting roles. Oseman said she "fell in love" with the characters while writing Solitaire and decided she needed to tell their story. Initially planning on writing a novel, she eventually realised their story needed an episodic structure that was more suited to a webcomic or graphic novel format.

Oseman started publishing Heartstopper as a webcomic on Tumblr and Tapas in September 2016. It gained a significant following, and Oseman decided to self-publish a limited run of physical copies covering the first two chapters of the series. On 20 June 2018, she launched a Kickstarter campaign to help fund the publishing, and within two hours, reached the targeted pledge. In October 2018, Hachette Children's Group (HCG) acquired the rights to physical publishing of the first two volumes of Heartstopper, and the following January, acquired the rights to the third and fourth volumes. They were released on 7 February and 11 July 2019, 6 February 2020 and 6 May 2021, respectively. A fifth and final volume is planned for release on 9 November 2023.

Oseman also began publishing Heartstopper on Webtoon in August 2019. Additionally, a Heartstopper-themed colouring book was published on 11 June 2020, followed by The Heartstopper Yearbook on 13 October 2022 by Hachette and Graphix.

Releases

Volumes

Tie-in books

Reception
Writing for The National, Gemma McLaughlin praised the novels for being able to "capture the attention" through "the small stories that make up life" rather than plot twists and heavy drama. She called the story "infinitely welcoming with characters that seem like real life friends", singling out Charlie as "extremely likeable" and praising the novels' treatment of his mental health. Publishers Weekly said that the novels' "leisurely pace and focus on everyday events ... allows the characters' relationship to develop in a natural, relatable way" and stated that the art style complemented the tone of the story. Imogen Russell Williams in The Times Literary Supplement called Oseman's illustration style "loose and flowing" and said of the novels that they "[engage] directly with shame, fear and anxiety, bringing them sweetly into the light". The A.V. Club included the webcomic on its list of "The best comics of 2018", with Caitlin Rosberg saying that it is "best defined by its kindness both to the characters and the reader". Metaphrog also included the comic on The Herald's 2019 list of "The best comics and graphic novels of the year as chosen by comic creators".

Terri Schlichenmeyer of the Washington Blade described Volume One of the novels as "one really sweet book" and praised the understanding treatment of characters struggling with their sexuality. She also felt that the realism of the novel was strengthened by the inclusion of bully characters. Kirkus Reviews stated that the placement of panels and their bordering in Volume One "prevent the visual graphics from going aesthetically stale" and that the hand-written lettering reinforced the story's human tone. They summarised the novel as "An adorable diary of love's gut punches". Summer Hayes reviewed Volume One in Booklist and praised Oseman's use of wordless panels to portray characters' emotions, although she felt that the illustrations were inconsistent. Overall, she concludes that "the romance and realistic fiction will draw readers into this sweet story". Kelley Gile reviewed Volume One in the School Library Journal, praising the dialogue, detailed facial expressions in the art, and "a font that mimics handwriting [that adds] to the adorkability factor".

Alaine Martaus also reviewed Volume One in The Bulletin of the Center for Children's Books in which she praised the "simple drawings" which she says "keep much of the focus on faces and phones, reinforcing a deeply interpersonal connection at the heart of the story". She described the story as being composed of "a series of charming vignettes". In a further review of Volume Two, Martaus reiterated her previous comments and said that the storytelling of the second volume "moves effortlessly from tearful poignance to laugh-worthy moments to stirring romance". Kirkus Reviews said of Volume Two that it retained the "distinctive style" of illustrations present in the first volume and that its transitions between panels were "creative" and "add creative flair". It praised the characters and described the story as "Incredibly lovable from start to finish". Sarah Rice reviewed Volume Two in Booklist and felt that Nick and Charlie's relationship was presented in a "heartfelt, gentle way" and praised the "loose art style [that] is full of lovely details, such as embarrassment and romantic blush lines".

In a review of Volume Two, Tiffany Babb of The A.V. Club praised the book's reproduction of the webcomic's art, its use of white space, and Oseman's handwritten lettering, which she says is "expressive ... in a way that feels both unique to her style and organic to the pacing of the comic". She felt that the treatment of Charlie and Nick's characters displayed "a level of understanding and care that elevates the story" and argued that the story "never devalued or ignored" the characters' other relationships with friends and family. Sarah Hughes of i included Volume Three in the newspaper's list of "Young Adult fiction: 25 of the best new books for 2020". Prudence Wade rated Volume Four 8/10 for The Independent and called it "a touching tale of teen love and accepting who you are". Fiona Noble also included Volume Four in The Guardian'''s list of "The best children's books of 2021", describing it as a "joyful, tender look at first love and relationships with an inclusive cast".

The webcomic series received more than 52 million views and the novel had sold more than one million copies worldwide.

Television adaptation

A television adaptation of Heartstopper'' entered development after See-Saw Films acquired the rights in July 2019. Production was greenlit in January 2021 by the streaming service Netflix as an eight-episode series written by Oseman and starring Joe Locke and Kit Connor as Charlie and Nick, respectively. It premiered on 22 April 2022 to high viewership and critical acclaim and has received numerous accolades. A second and third season are currently in development.

As a tie-in to the series, the first volume of the graphic novel was re-released on 28 April 2022 with new cover art featuring Locke and Connor as Charlie and Nick recreating the original illustrated cover, as well as an excerpt of the show's script. The graphic novel became the top-selling children's book in the UK following the popularity of the Netflix series.

References

External links
Official website

British graphic novels
LGBT-related graphic novels
LGBT-related webcomics
2016 webcomic debuts
Comics adapted into television series
Tapastic webcomics
Webtoons